Tolmiea menziesii is a species of flowering plant in the family Saxifragaceae. It is known by the common names youth on age, pick-a-back-plant, piggyback plant, and thousand mothers.
It is a perennial plant native to the West Coast of North America, occurring in northern California, Oregon, Washington, British Columbia and southern Alaska. It occurs as a naturalised plant or garden escapee in Scotland, parts of Wales, Northern Ireland and northern and western parts of England.

Description

Tolmiea menziesii has hairy, five to seven-lobed, toothed leaves and a capsule fruit containing spiny seeds

It bears many small flowers in a loose raceme. Each flower consists of a tubular purple-green to brown-green calyx and four linear or subulate (awl-shaped) red-brown petals, about twice the length of the sepals.

It has unusual reproductive habits. It grows plantlets from the petiole near the base of each leaf. The plantlets drop off, fall in the soil, and take root there. It will also reproduce by rhizomes and by seeds.

Taxonomy
The genus was named after the Scottish-Canadian botanist William Fraser Tolmie, while the species name refers to Archibald Menzies, the Scottish naturalist for the Vancouver Expedition (1791–1795).

The plant was formerly considered to be the only member of a monotypic genus until diploid populations (due to autopolyploidy) were split off as a separate species T. diplomenziesii from the tetraploid populations.

Cultivation
Tolmiea menziesii is commonly cultivated as an ornamental plant, for use as a house plant or planted as a groundcover in gardens. It requires moisture and does not tolerate much sun or dryness.

References

External links
Jepson Manual Treatment of Tolmiea menziesii
Video and commentary on T. menziesii in the wild.

Saxifragaceae
Flora of the West Coast of the United States
Flora of Alaska
Flora of British Columbia
Flora of California
Flora of Oregon
Flora of Washington (state)
Flora of the Klamath Mountains
Natural history of the California Coast Ranges
Garden plants of North America
House plants
Groundcovers
Flora without expected TNC conservation status